Zombiedumb (or also written as Zombie Dumb), is a South Korean series of television animated shorts produced by Anyzac and aired by KBS1 in South Korea. Zombiedumb was distributed by Netflix, until its removal from the platform in 2020.

The show's plot is set as a group of zombies living in a deserted place where they try to eat a young girl, who is the last human being in the city.

In other countries, Zombiedumb is also aired by Niki Kids in Ukraine, and Disney Channel in South Korea and Southeast Asia. In 2021, Anyzac (via its official Zombiedumb YouTube channel) announced that the third season will be released in 2022. 

In September 2022, Anyzac announced in a blog that Season 3 will premiere on KBS1 on October 20th: The following month, the third season premiered on October 27th, 2022.

Plot
Hana is the only human resident of Moon Street. She lived with 5 different zombies; each of the zombies have a unique basis. They appeared from a graveyard and were affected by a magical moon, earning them different types of brains. Their names are Zombill, Zomgirl, Zomjack, Zomson, Zomkong, and Zompet (a zombified bat), all of which their names start with "Zom".

In Season 2, all characters can live in day instead of night thanks to sunscreen and more characters were added including Zombo, Zomchee, Zomko, and a dog-like zombie named Momo.

Characters

Season 1
In Korean; the male characters are voiced by Ko Seong-il, while female characters are voiced by Lee Myung-hee.
Hana: a young girl who is the only human resident of Moon Street. Originally, the zombies saw her as nothing more than brain food, but by the end of the first season, they have all come to see her as a genuine friend.
Zombill: a rockstar zombie that wears headphones and a jacket with a peace symbol zipper.
Zomgirl: an actress-based zombie that wears sunglasses.
Zomjack: an inventor-based zombie who lives in an underground lab with Zompet.
Zompet: a bat (who was affected by zombies) that lives with Zomjack.
Zomson: a zombie that is based on Michael Jackson. His body was wrapped in linen, like mummies.
Zomkong: a zombie that is named after the King Kong character. He has a voodoo doll named Mini.
Skull: Un-dead skeletons that reside on Moon St.

Season 2
Zombo
Zomchee
Zomko
Momo

List of episodes

Season 1
The first 5 "quadruple features" (in reference to double features) aired between October 30 to November 28, 2015 on KBS1, while the remaining 10 aired on May 21 until July 23, 2016. Each of these comprising episodes have a 3-minute average runtime.

Season 2
The season premiered a special broadcast on October 21, 2017 on KBS 1TV.

Merchandising

Zombiedumb had been released into sticker books, plush toys, action figures, smartphone cases, and others.

Alongside it, GS25 released more than 60 products like snacks, ice creams, and others during Halloween of 2019, based on the Zombiedumb series.

Apps
Mobirix released a mobile puzzle game entitled Zombiedumb Jelly which was developed by Rainfallsoft, on April 25, 2016. Mobirix has also released a similar mobile game titled Jewelry King: Zombie Dumb.

References

External links
 '좀비덤 ZOMBIEDUMB' channel on YouTube

2010s animated television series
2010s South Korean animated television series
2015 South Korean television series debuts
South Korean children's animated comedy television series
Animated television series without speech
Computer-animated television series
2019 South Korean television series endings